Loïck Fanny Luypaert (born 19 August 1991) is a Belgian field hockey player who plays as a defender for Braxgata and the Belgian national team.

He combines his sports career with an educational program of Movement Science at the Vrije Universiteit Brussel.

Club career
Luypaert started playing hockey at Braxgata. Between 2007 and 2009, he was active in Royal Herakles HC, in 2009 he moved to the KHC Dragons. In 2011, he won the Golden Stick (in the category junior male players), a Belgian award for year's best field hockey player. In 2014, he transferred to Kampong in Utrecht. After one year, he returned to Braxgata.

International career
Luypaert became European champions with the Belgium U21 squad in 2012.   He was selected for the 2012 Summer Olympics but was eventually omitted in the final selection. Luypaert became European vice-champion with Belgium at the 2013 European Championship on home ground in Boom, Belgium. He was a part of the Belgian squad that won the 2018 World Cup. In August 2019, he was selected in the Belgium squad for the 2019 EuroHockey Championship. They won Belgium its first European title by defeating Spain 5-0 in the final. On 25 May 2021, he was selected in the squad for the 2021 EuroHockey Championship.

References

External links

1991 births
Living people
People from Edegem
Belgian male field hockey players
Male field hockey defenders
Field hockey players at the 2016 Summer Olympics
Field hockey players at the 2020 Summer Olympics
2018 Men's Hockey World Cup players
Olympic field hockey players of Belgium
Olympic silver medalists for Belgium
Olympic medalists in field hockey
Medalists at the 2016 Summer Olympics
KHC Dragons players
SV Kampong players
Men's Hoofdklasse Hockey players
Expatriate field hockey players
Belgian expatriate sportspeople in the Netherlands
Men's Belgian Hockey League players
Olympic gold medalists for Belgium
Medalists at the 2020 Summer Olympics
Sportspeople from Antwerp Province
2023 Men's FIH Hockey World Cup players